Adalbert Rozsnyai, (born 17 April 1952) is a former Romanian football player and coach.

He played for FC Baia Mare, Jiul Petroşani and Dinamo Bucharest. Rozsnyai was fourth-leading scorer with 13 goals in the Romanian Divizia A during the 1972–73 season.

The highlight of his playing career was winning the Romanian Cup in 1974 with Jiul Petroşani, where he also scored a goal in the final.

He coached FC Baia Mare both as assistant coach and head coach.

Honours

Player
Jiul Petroșani
Cupa României: 1973–74
Dinamo București
Divizia A: 1976–77
FC Baia Mare
Divizia B: 1977–78, 1982–83
Cupa României runner-up: 1981–82

Coach
FC Baia Mare
Divizia C: 2005–06

Notes

References

External links
 

1952 births
Living people
Romanian footballers
Association football forwards
Liga I players
Liga II players
CS Minaur Baia Mare (football) players
FC Dinamo București players
CSM Jiul Petroșani players
Romanian football managers
CS Minaur Baia Mare (football) managers